Thomas Walter Darrah (11 July 1873 – 21 January 1955) was a United States military officer. He participated in a number of U.S. military conflicts including the Spanish–American War, the Philippine–American War and World War I.

Early life and education 
Darrah was born in Marquette, Kansas on 11 July 1873 to Samuel Jones Darrah and Mary, née Temperly. He graduated from the United States Military Academy at West Point on 1895, one of his classmates was Joe Wheeler Jr., the son of Joseph Wheeler, former Confederate cavalry general and later U.S. Army major general. Later in life, Darrah also graduated from the Army School of the Line (1920), the Army Staff College (1921) and the Army War College (1923).

Military career 
In 1895, Darrah was commissioned second lieutenant in the U.S. Army. He took part in the Spanish–American War, serving as a member of the sanitary corps in Cuba, and then in the subsequent Philippine–American War, during the Moro Rebellion from 1903–1905. Darrah was also a member of the U.S. Army's Subsistence Department from 1901–1905. After his service in the Philippines, Darrah returned to West Point, where he taught chemistry from 1907–1911. When the U.S. entered World War I in 1917, Darrah was senior instructor at the Officers' Training Camp at Fort Benjamin Harrison in Indianapolis. He was promoted to colonel of infantry in the National Army and sent to Fort Meade in Maryland to command the 314th Infantry until 1918. On 12 April 1918, Darrah was promoted to brigadier general and went to France. There he commanded the 55th Brigade and took part in major battles, including the Second Battle of the Marne and the Meuse-Argonne Offensive.

After the war, Darrah attended office training schools and then served in various chief-of-staff and command positions. He was chief of staff for the Fourth Corps Area from 1924–1926 and then returned to Fort Meade to commanded the 34th Infantry from 1926–1928. Darrah returned to the position of chief of staff, this time of the Third Corps Area, until 1931 and then from 1932–1934 he commanded the Pacific Section of the Panama Canal Department. Darrah finally retired in 1937 and returned to his home in New York City.

Darrah was awarded with two Silver Star commendations for "gallantry in action" during his services in Santiago, Cuba and Legaspi, Luzon in the Philippines.

Later career 
Although retired from the military, during World War II Darrah served as New York State's Deputy Director of Civilian Defense.

Personal life and death 
In 1899, Darrah married Rose Wood, they had two daughters: Marion Maxwell and Jean West. He died on 21 January 1955 and was buried in Arlington National Cemetery.

References 

United States Army generals of World War I
United States Army generals
1873 births
1955 deaths
American military personnel of the Spanish–American War
American military personnel of the Philippine–American War
People from McPherson County, Kansas
United States Army War College alumni
Burials at Arlington National Cemetery
Recipients of the Silver Star
United States Army Command and General Staff College alumni
Military personnel from Kansas